Community Medical Center, is an integrated health care facility based in Missoula, Montana.

Overview
Community Medical Center is on a  campus located near the center of the Missoula valley.

Services
Community Medical Center is the only facility providing obstetrical and newborn care in Missoula County, Montana, and is one of the largest such programs in the state of Montana. It also offers residential and transitional living and day treatment program for brain injury survivors, and the elderly. It is also the only hospital in western Montana that has a separate Pediatric Intensive Care Unit for kids.

New Women's and Newborn Center
, the Community Medical Center is constructing a brand new Women's and Newborn Center, which is supposed to add  to the existing  obstetrical and newborn care unit. The total estimated cost of this project is 17.8 million dollars.

See also
List of hospitals in Montana

References

External links
Community Medical Center Home
Community Medical center About Us
Missoula Montana relocation information

Healthcare in Missoula, Montana
Hospitals in Montana
Buildings and structures in Missoula, Montana
1922 establishments in Montana